David Simchi-Levi is an American academic working as a Professor of Engineering Systems at Massachusetts Institute of Technology. He is also the founder or co-founder of several companies. Simchi-Levi's research focuses on supply chain management, revenue management, and business analytics.

Education 

David Simchi-Levi obtained his B.Sc. in Aeronautical Engineering at Technion Israel Institute of Technology in 1978 and earned M.Sc. and Ph.D. in Operations Research from Faculty of Management at Tel Aviv University in 1984 and 1987 respectively.

Career 
He has been a lecturer in Tel Aviv University (1984–1985) and Columbia University (1986–1987). He became an assistant professor in the Department of Industrial Engineering and Operations Research in Columbia University (1987–1991). He then joined Northwestern University in 1993 as an associate professor in the Department of Industrial Engineering and Management Sciences, and was promoted to full professor in 1997. Now he is a professor in Massachusetts Institute of Technology. He was a co-director of Leaders for Global Operations (2003–2016), a dual degree program at MIT, and a co-director of Systems Design and Management (2003–2010).

Publications 

David Simchi-Levi's publications have been cited 22516 times in total, with 65 h-index and 156 i10-index. He co-authored the book Designing & Managing the Supply Chain. Simchi-Levi is the current Editor-in-Chief of Management Science and was the Editor-in-Chief for Operations Research from 2006 to 2012.

Entrepreneurship 
Simchi-Levi was the founder of LogicTools which provided software and professional services for supply chain optimization.
 
In 2014, he co-founded Opalytics, a cloud analytics platform company focusing on operations and supply chain intelligence.

Recognition
He was elected to the 2006 class of Fellows of the Institute for Operations Research and the Management Sciences.

In 2020, he was awarded the prestigious INFORMS Impact Prize for playing a leading role in developing and disseminating a new highly impactful paradigm for the identification and mitigation of risks in global supply chains.

In 2023, he has been elected a member of the National Academy of Engineering for contributions using optimization and stochastic modeling to enhance supply chain management and operations.

References 

MIT School of Engineering faculty
Living people
Year of birth missing (living people)
Academic journal editors
American operations researchers
Technion – Israel Institute of Technology alumni
Tel Aviv University alumni
Academic staff of Tel Aviv University
Northwestern University faculty
Columbia University faculty
Fellows of the Institute for Operations Research and the Management Sciences